Kuldīga Municipality is a municipality in Courland, Latvia. The municipality was formed in 2009 by merging Ēdole parish, Gudenieki parish, Īvande parish, Kabile parish, Kurmāle parish, Laidi parish, Padure parish, Pelči parish, Renda parish, Rumba parish, Snēpele parish, Turlava parish, Vārme parish and Kuldīga town. The administrative centre is Kuldīga. As of 2020, the population was 22,028.

During the 2021 Latvian administrative reform, the previous municipality was merged with Alsunga Municipality and Skrunda Municipality. The new municipality now fully corresponds with the area of the former Kuldīga District.

History 
Kuldīga municipality was established on 1 July 2009. Before that, it was a part of Kuldīga District, which also included Alsunga and Skrunda districts. Kuldīga district was established in 1949. From 1952 to 1953, Kuldīga district was included in Liepāja District.

From 1819 to 1949, most of Kuldīga parish belonged to Kuldīga district. At that time, Ēdole Parish was part of Ventspils District, but Gudenieki Parish, as well as part of Turlava Parish (Klostere Parish) and Laidi Parish (Valtaiķi Parish) were in Aizpute District.

Twin towns — sister cities

Kuldīga is twinned with:

 Drøbak, Norway
 Geesthacht, Germany
 Mtskheta, Georgia

Images

See also
 Administrative divisions of Latvia

References

 
Municipalities of Latvia